Hyphodiscus is a genus of fungi within the Hyaloscyphaceae family. The genus contains six species.

References

External links
Hyphodiscus at Index Fungorum

Hyaloscyphaceae